Vintage Guitar is an American magazine that focuses on vintage and classic guitars, amplifiers, effects, and related equipment, as well as notable guitarists from all genres and eras. The publication's feature stories and monthly columns cover a diverse range of topics by contributors, including some of the biggest names in the industry and renowned authorities like Dan Erlewine, George Gruhn, Wolf Marshall, Richard Smith, and Seymour W. Duncan, as well as some of the best-known writers in the field, including Pete Prown, Walter Carter, Dan Forte, Dave Hunter, Rich Kienzle, Michael Dregni, John Peden, Greg Prato, and others.

The magazine's classified-ad section provides readers with access to classic, used and new guitars, amps, accessories, books, videos, and more. Other editorial content focuses on reviews of music as well as informed, objective reviews of new gear. Vintage Guitar also includes monthly repair columns written by noted repair expert/luthier Dan Erlewine.

Originally published as The Music Trader, its inaugural issue was distributed in September, 1986, with the intent of achieving two goals: to supply musicians with a market to buy and sell instruments and equipment or locate other musicians, and to inform and entertain readers. Today, these remain the basic goals of the magazine. Though The Music Trader was a publication for all types of instruments, the majority of advertisements and articles were guitar-centric. In 1989, publisher Alan Greenwood changed its name to Vintage Guitar magazine because he felt it better represented the publication.

VG Classics
From 1993–1997, Vintage Guitar also published the periodical VG Classics. Much like the monthly, it focused on classic guitars and amps but in a traditionally-sized format on thicker, glossy stock and employing layouts designed to highlight the artistic photography commissioned for its use. In 2001, VG began using glossy paper in the editorial sections of its monthly offering.

Vintage Guitar books
For more than two decades, the magazine has also published The Official Vintage Guitar Price Guide through its Vintage Guitar Books imprint. Adapted from the 1988 article "Asking Price – Selling Price," The Guide originally appeared as a monthly installment titled "The Instrument Price Guide" in the April '89 issue. In 1992, the company issued the first version of The Guide as a booklet, and today the annual book compiles historical data and lists values on more than 2,000 brands derived from comprehensive research and market analysis on thousands of vintage and recent–model guitars, amps, basses, effects pedals, mandolins, lap steels, ukuleles, and banjos. It is regarded by professional players, guitar dealers, and collectors as the premier source for accurate values on vintage gear. To date, The Guide has sold more than 150,000 copies, and in 2012 it became available on digital e–readers.

The company's Vintage Guitar Book imprint has published several other books:

 Stellas & Stratocasters (1994), by Willie G. Moseley, is an anthology of articles, interviews, and columns from the pages of VG, including talks with Eric Johnson, Jeff Cook, and Noel Redding.
 Guitar Stories: Volume One (1995), by Michael Wright, is a look at the histories of some of the more interesting instruments that have – successfully and sometimes unsuccessfully – tried to win the hearts of Americans dreaming of their 15 minutes of fame strapped to a six–string.
 Executive Rock: A Fan's Perspective on the Evolution of Popular Music Since 1950 (1996), by Willie G. Moseley, is a collection of essays that originally appeared in the VG column "Executive Rock."
 Guitar Stories: Volume Two (2000), by Michael Wright, continues where Volume One left off. A foray into more brands that made a heavy impact in the world of the guitar, and how its many forms came to be. More than 800 rare photos help tell the tale of these instruments, from the innovations of Mario Maccaferri to Martin's journeys into the solid body kingdom.
 Guitar People (1997), by Willie G. Moseley, includes 65 profiles and interviews with guitar players and builders, discussing equipment, bands, and performances.
 Bill Carson: My Life and Time with Fender Musical Instruments (1998), by Bill Carson with Willie G. Moseley, is the inspiring, quintessential American success story of Bill Carson and Fender.

Online
Since 1995, VG has maintained a website that features archival editorial content, the magazine's Hall of Fame page, an RSS feed with the latest industry news, regular promotional giveaways, a store in which it sells books and other merchandise, and various other features. The magazine also maintains a Twitter account that features news from industry insiders and insight into the latest products, gear and technology, and more. And in 2012, the magazine began publishing a twice-monthly e-newsletter called VG Overdrive, or VGOD.

Hall of Fame
Each year, Vintage Guitar magazine honors those who inspire and awe guitar players, fans, and listeners by inducting great players, innovators, and instruments to the VG Hall of Fame. The Hall of Fame began in 1990 with the induction of the Fender Stratocaster and Gibson Les Paul Standard. Today, the Hall of Fame includes four categories: Instrument, Innovator, Player, and Album of the Year. Nominations are solicited from contributors and visitors to the magazine's web site.

Innovators 
 2011 – Seymour W. Duncan 
 2010 – Paul Reed Smith  
 2009 – George Fullerton 
 2008 – Floyd Rose 
 2007 – Dick Denney
 2006 – John D'Angelico
 2005 – John Dopyera and Rudy Dopyera
 2004 – Hartley Peavey
 2003 – Lloyd Loar 
 2002 – Paul Bigsby 
 1999 – Adolf Rickenbacker 
 1998 – Jim Marshall 
 1997 – Seth Lover 
 1996 – C.F. Martin, Sr.
 1995 – Ted McCarty 
 1993 – Les Paul 
 1992 – Orville Gibson 
 1991 – Leo Fender

Instruments
 2011 – Fender Deluxe Reverb
 2010 – Gibson Byrdland
 2009 – Gibson SG Standard
 2008 – Gibson Les Paul Model (Goldtop)
 2007 – Gibson J-45 and Vox AC15
 2006 – Fender Jaguar and Gibson ES-5
 2005 – Mesa-Boogie Mark I & National Tricone series
 2004 – PRS Custom & Gretsch White Falcon
 2003 – Gibson Les Paul Custom & Marshall Super Lead 100
 2002 – Fender Jazzmaster & Gibson SJ-200
 1999 – Vox Wah & Gibson ES-150
 1998 – Fender Bassman
 1997 – Rickenbacker 360/12
 1996 – Gibson Flying V & Gretsch 6120
 1995 – Fender Jazz Bass & Fender Twin amp
 1994 – Gibson L-5 & Vox AC-30 amp
 1993 – D'Angelico New Yorker & Gibson Super 400
 1992 – Fender Precision Bass & Gibson ES-335
 1991 – Martin D-28 & Fender Telecaster
 1990 – Fender Stratocaster & Gibson Les Paul Standard

Players 
2011 – Keith Richards 
2010 – Robert Johnson 
2009 – Buddy Guy 
2008 – Duane Allman 
2007 – Les Paul 
2006 – Stevie Ray Vaughan 
2005 – Django Reinhardt 
2004 – George Harrison 
2003 – Jeff Beck 
2002 – Chuck Berry 
1999 – Jimmy Page 
1998 – Eric Clapton 
1997 – B. B. King 
1996 – Chet Atkins 
1994 – Jimi Hendrix

References

External links
Vintage Guitar website
Music magazines published in the United States
Guitar magazines
Magazines established in 1986
Magazines published in North Dakota